The 1742 (Malayalam 917) Treaty of Mannar restored peace and annexed parts of Kayamkulam to Travancore.

History 

The king of Kollam (Desiganad Dynasty) adopted a prince from Kayamkulam Royal Family. Marthanda Varma, the Maharaja of Travancore, disliked this adoption because he wanted to merge Kollam with Travancore after the Raja as he had no male descendants. Maharaja sent his army to Kollam and defeated the Raja. After the war he annexed Kollam to Travancore. Maharaja brought Kollam Raja to Travancore and built a palace for him (Valiya Koyikkal Kottaram (Palace)), and treated him with royal dignity.

In 1734 Raja escaped from Travancore with the help of Kayamkulam King. Kayamkulam Raja helped to return him to the throne and strengthened his army with the help of Cochi. Kollam became more powerful.

Maharaja sent his Army to Kayamkulam and Kollam under Ramayyan Dalawa. Kayamkulam king was shot and Kayamkulam surrendered and appealed for peace. After the death of Kollam Raja disputes resumed. Kayamkulam encroached Kollam because of the adoption rule. But Travancore denied this saying the adoption was cancelled in 1731. Again war broke out.

Kayamkulam sought the help of the Dutch. In 1741 Maharaja defeated Rani of Kollam and she fled to Cochi. In 1742 the Armies of the  Dutch and Kayamkulam attacked Travancore and seized Kilimanoor Fort. For recapturing the fort Maharaja fought for continues 68 days and defeated the enemies.

Treaty 

Maharaja forced the Kayamkulam King to sign a treaty at Mannar in 1742. Raja agreed to merge a major portion of Kayamkulam  with  Travancore and also pay 1000 rupees every year.

Results 

Kayamkulam Raja never agreed the treaty and considered it an insult. Maharaja forced him to pay the tribute. Raja dumped all his wealth in Astamudi Lake and fled to the northern Region. The messengers of Maharaja found nothing but an empty palace.

References 

 Mannaar Desaperumayute kathha by Dr. K. Balakrishna Pillai
 A History of Travancore from the Earliest Times; by P. Shungoonny Menon; published 1878

History of Kerala
History of India